is a Japanese composer and recording artist. He is a voting member of The Recording Academy, and his work has been described as "one of this world's artistic treasures." As an exclusive player for KAWAI pianos, Masuda is the sole player of the one million dollar Crystal Grand Piano. A maestro composer to the Vatican. A nobleman of Europe and Asia. The United Nations Peace International Initiative Ambassador.

Biography

Early life 
Kento Masuda was born in Katori, Chiba. He began playing keyboards at the age of 5. While preferring to compose his own music instead of playing standard repertoires, Masuda took part in a variety of contests for talented young musicians. By the age of 10, he began winning competitions including the Junior Original Competition of Yamaha Music Foundation.

Early music career 
From 1990, Masuda began conducting professional public performances as YAMAHA's employed musician at age of 17, while playing classical and modern compositions for events, ceremony halls and Yamaha shop on 5th Ave in New York. Just a year later Masuda released his original first album "Wheel of Fortune". Between 1993 and 1995, Masuda lived in New York where he worked in the area of music production, collaborating with producers such as Phil Rubin and Lee Shapiro. His success at such a young age set the foundation for a lifetime of performances, composing, and music production.

During this time, Masuda worked on several musical projects and jobs, including radio, game, and TV/CM music offerings in Tokyo. These were written (both music and lyrics), arranged, and performed on keyboards by Masuda. "MYOJYOW" was audio mastered by Bobby Hata. On 26 October 1999, Masuda released "MEMORIES". Both albums were submitted in the U.S. which resulted in Masuda receiving positive feedback from major companies, including Steve Vai's management office of Sepetys Entertainment Group in Santa Monica. CEO Ruta Sepetys (who is also a music producer) suggested that Masuda join forces with recording artist Steve Vai, but Masuda chose to remain a solo artist.

2000s 
In 2000, Masuda established his own publishing company and label, Kent on Music, Inc. (ASCAP) as well as producing and recording studio "Externalnet" in Tokyo. The 6th album "HANDS" released on August 26, 2003, was mixed with a producer Tadashi Namba and mastered by Bobby Hata in Los Angeles CA. The album was promoted to MIDEM in Cannes, France. It then entered the European music market, particularly among German audiences, which led to Masuda's interview with Klassik Radio Hamburg. Additionally, program sponsor Galerie ATTA's owner Ruth Atta along with artist Delphine Charat, who painted Masuda's portrait, showed the connection of music to painting to masterpiece.

In 2005, Masuda signed with JPMC Records, a Swiss label based in New York and became a member of the ASCAP. His 7th album, "GlobeSounds," was released on 13 June 2006, and mixed with Grammy-nominated producer Charles Eller and Lane Gibson. "GlobeSounds" was mastered by Bobby Hata. During the recording of "GlobeSounds", Hon. Ambassador Madeleine M. Kunin visited at Eller's music studio in Charlotte, Vermont, US.

In 2007, Masuda's music has enjoyed continued growth from Myspace and Last.FM along with recent airplay on radio stations internationally. His catalog of compositions and recordings has been featured on MTV, NME Magazine, and BBC Music. In 2009, Masuda created several music videos: "So We Are" "Shine On" a documentary film "Down to Earth" which describe his album "GlobeSounds" and "Musical Notation and Concrete Poetry" (featuring the author Diana Macs and the Portuguese poet, Luís Adriano Carlos).

2010s 
 

Masuda's 8th album "Light Speed+" was released on 11 September 2010. With a strong emphasis and weight on composition, Masuda also showcased his unique style with a full-length synthesis album.

In 2011, Masuda composed music for renowned designer Yohji Yamamoto's Femme Autumn Winter 2011–2012 Paris Fashion Week fashion show which featured his compositions "Hands" and "Little Tokyo Poetry". They continued to collaborate on Masuda's creative short music film "Godsend Rondo" directed by Tomo Oya in Hokkaido. In this film Masuda dressed in Yamamoto's Ready-to-wear collection. The film "Godsend Rondo" has won numerous awards.

On 26 September 2012, Masuda's first piano solo album and piano book "All in the Silence" was released, followed by two live performances "Force in the Silence" and "Force in the Silence 2" at Musicasa Acoustic Concert Hall in Tokyo, Japan. His performances featured classic pieces that highlighted his career thus far, with themes that touch upon the many feelings of life along with those unspoken but shared thoughts that transcend all borders.

On 16 April 2014, Kento Masuda released his 10th album "'Loved One," which was produced by Masuda and multiple award-winning Miami producer Gary Vandy. "Loved One" was recorded at Gary Vandy's Studio Center in Miami, which has produced recordings that have won 8 Grammy awards along with multiple platinum albums. "Loved One" features musicians Paul Messina (Flashpoint) and Kevin Marcus Sylvester (Black Violin) and utilizes the HQCD process for superior sound quality.

On 14 November 2014, Masuda produced and performed in the multi-cultural concert "5 ELEMENTS LIVE" at CASA DEI DIRITTI in Milan, Italy. This unique evening of music connected the sounds and voices of the east and west, while producers and collaborators shared their vision that music is both absolute and life affirming.

On 6 December 2014, Masuda performed at the "Associazione dei Cavalieri di San Silvestro" celebration of Monumentalis Ecclesiae Sancti Silvestri Societas in Tivoli, Italy.

On 8 February 2015, Kento Masuda attended the prestigious 57th GRAMMY Awards Ceremony in Los Angeles. Kento had four official submissions for this year's GRAMMY consideration from his latest album, "Loved One", produced by Kento and Gary Vandy.

On 5 July 2017, Kento Masuda received an Artisan World Festival Peace International Initiative "Music, Performance & Humanitarian" Award at the United Nations in New York. This selection is based on his continued engagement with the performing arts and commitment to humanitarian projects that promote cultural diversity, cultural preservation, and world peace in addition to your innovative contribution in music. This group is a part of New Generation In Action an organization supported by the United Nations with Special Consultative Status with the United Nations for Economic and Social Development.

Masuda attended the 61st Annual Grammy Awards with Swedish pop star Elsa Andren on February 10, 2019.

On 11 May 2019, Kento Masuda performed at the Knights of Saint Sylvester Gala at the St. Regis Rome Grand Hotel, in which he performed for highly distinguished guests, heads of states and business executives.

2020s 
On December 21, 2021, Kento Masuda released his 11th album "KENTOVERSE", which was produced by Masuda and multiple award-winning producer Gary Vandy. It utilizes the high-resolution audio, lossless compression, FLAC such as 24bit 96 kHz process for superior sound quality. Each composition conveys emotions in an intricate blend of notes, a matrix of rhythm and tones. The milestones of this album include the compositional commission from the masonic theme of the Great Architect of the Universe to a royal march for the House of Rurikovich, where Masuda also has been honored with the title of Count. Where silence is the soul of everything, where heaven enters the heart and becomes the universe, where time no longer exists, where the instant is eternity. There are moments that mark our lives, moments when time is divided into two parts: before and after.

Style and influence 

Masuda's composing style is characterized by intricate keyboard lines with obvious melodies, deep percussion grooves, and layers of rhythm and sound that draw the listener into a whole new world with each note. His music is described as "inspiring and mesmerising", "soft and gentle". His compositions have a vertical transcendence, an upward trajectory "that brings an integration with the divine."

From his interview, Masuda says that he was influenced by both Johann Sebastian Bach; "His music theory has a major impact on everything, even today". And Alan Menken; "The music of Disney films has so much magic in himself and always promises a happy ending".

Kento Masuda is also a member of Freemasonry. He is known as a composer of Masonic music.

According to Charles Eller: “Kento is an artist as well as an incredible craftsman at writing highly imaginative music that defies categorization in a good way. The music has extremely lush textures that work by defining intricate themes that evolve throughout each spellbinding composition.” According to Gary Vandy: “Kento Masuda is one of this world’s artistic treasures. His music is at once sonically spiritual and visually expressive. You can see his music. The blend of smooth melodies and rhythmic grooves transports the listener. The environment Kento creates, allows participation in his sculpture of sound.”

Honorary titles 
2014  Title "Knight" and "Maestro". Honored by Monsignor Luigi Casolini, awarded to the Knights of the Order of St. Sylvester.
2016  Title “Knight”. Honored by S.A.S. Prince Don Basilio Cali Rurikovich, awarded to the Order of Knights of Malta.
2016  Title “Knight Commander”. Honored by H.R. & I.H. Grand Prince Jorge Rurikovich, awarded to the Order of Rurik dynasty.
2017 ,  Title "Baron" and "Knight Commander". Honored by Baron don Michele Maria Biallo, awarded to the Noble Order of Saint George of Rougemont (Confrèrie de Rougemont).
2017  Honored by Artisan World Festival Peace International Initiative, awarded to the Music, Performance & Humanitarian Award.
2018  Title "Grand Prior of Japan". Honored by S.A.S. Prince Don Basilio Cali Rurikovich, awarded to the Order of Knights of Malta.
2018  Title "Grand Cross". Honored by Brazilian government, awarded to the Order of Merit of Education and Integration.
2019  Title "Count". Honored by H.R. & I.H. Grand Prince Hans Máximo Cabrera Lochaber Rurikovich, awarded to the Order of Rurik dynasty.
2019  Title “Commander”. Honored by Sovereign Heraldic Institution, awarded to the Brazilian heraldry Universal Peace Order.
2020  Gold medal by the Humanist Institute of the National Council in Paris, France.
 2020 ,  Honored by the World Organization For Human Rights (Affiliated to United Nations), awarded to the Certificate of Appreciation.
2022  Title “Ennobled Knight". Honored by Oheneba Nana Kame Obeng II, awarded to the Royal House of Sefwi Obeng-Mim.

Discography

Studio albums

Music film

Bibliography

Piano book

Awards and nominations

References

External links 

1973 births
ASCAP composers and authors
Composers for piano
Composers of masonic music
Intellectual property activism
Japanese classical composers
Japanese classical pianists
Japanese film producers
Japanese Freemasons
Japanese keyboardists
Japanese male classical composers
Japanese male classical pianists
Japanese people of Russian descent
Japanese record producers
Knights of Malta
Knights of the Order of St. Sylvester
Living people
Musicians from Chiba Prefecture
Musicians from Tokyo
People from Katori, Chiba
Recipients of the Order of Culture
Kento Masuda albums